Steven Bernstrom (born 7 April 1991) is a Filipino professional rugby union footballer who played for NTT Docomo Red Hurricanes in the Japanese Top League. His regular position is Number 8.

Playing career

Rugby League

Bernstrom played rugby league for the Philippines national rugby league team.

Rugby Union

On 19 April 2019, Bernstrom was announced to be playing professional rugby union for the NTT Docomo Red Hurricanes in the Japan Top League.

On 7 August 2019, Bernstrom was announced to be departing the NTT Docomo Red Hurricanes.

References 

1991 births
Living people